Yalovarnika is a 2,763 m-high peak in the Pirin mountain range, south-western Bulgaria. It is located in the northern part of Pirin on the 22 km-long Kamenitsa secondary ridge between the summits of Kamenitsa (2,822 m) to the north and Zabat (2,688 m), Kuklite (2,686 m) and Golena (2,633 m) to the south.

Yalovarnika is a massive granite peak. Seen from the Mozgovishka Gate, its distinctive double-peak profile stands out between the summits of Kamenitsa and Kuklite. The former is connected to Yalovarnika through a series of steep rock gendarmes. A deeply cut saddle divides it from Zabat to the south-west.

The north-western slopes of Yalovarnika are open to the pebbly Begovitsa cirque and have a typical alpine look. They are almost vertical, severely smoothed and eroded, with extensive anhydrous stone-piles at the base of the summit. To the north-east, the slopes are also rocky and harbour the Manenko Lake at their base.

The southern and south-eastern slopes are oblique, grassy and covered with juniper. They are a massive denudation, descending to the valley of the Pirinska Bistritsa river at an altitude of 1900-2000 m and forming the northern parts of the Bashmandra cirque. From these slopes there are numerous streams that flow into the Bashmandra river.

Citations

References 
 
 

Mountains of Pirin
Landforms of Blagoevgrad Province
Two-thousanders of Bulgaria